This is a list of buns. A bun is a small, sometimes sweet, bread, or bread roll. Though they come in many shapes and sizes, they are most commonly hand-sized or smaller, with a round top and flat bottom.

Buns
A
 Anpan - A bun that is filled, usually with red bean paste, or with white beans, sesame, or chestnut
B

 Bakpao - Indonesian term for steamed bun. The bun is usually filled with ground pork, but can instead be filled with other ingredients, such as mung bean paste, ground peanuts, or vegetables.
 Bánh bao – Vietnamese meaning "Enveloping Cake", which is a ball-shaped bun containing pork or chicken meat, onions, eggs, mushrooms and vegetables, in the Vietnamese cuisine
 Baozi – A type of steamed, filled bun or bread-like item made with baker's yeast in various Chinese cuisines, as there is much variation as to the fillings and the preparations
 Bath bun – A rich and round sweet roll that has a lump of sugar baked in the bottom and more crushed sugar sprinkled on top after baking
 Beef bun – A type of Hong Kong pastry; one of the most standard pastries in Hong Kong and can also be found in most Chinatown bakery shops; has a ground beef filling, sometimes including pieces of onions
 Belgian bun – A sweet bun containing sultanas and usually topped with fondant icing and half a glace cherry
 Blaa – A dough-like, white bread bun (roll) speciality particularly associated with Waterford, Ireland; historically, the blaa is also believed to have been made in Kilkenny and Wexford
 Boston bun – A large spiced bun with a thick layer of coconut icing, prevalent in Australia and New Zealand
 Bread roll - A short, oblong, or round bun served usually before or with meals, often with butter.
 Bun kebab – A spicy Pakistani patty which is shallow-fried, onions, and chutney or raita in a hot dog bun
 Buñuelo — A fried dough ball popular in Latin America, Greece, Guam, Turkey, Israel and Morocco. It will usually have a filling or a topping.
 Butterkaka – A bun similar to cinnamon rolls, but where several buns are compressed together and baked in a cake pan like sticky buns.

C

 Cha siu bao – A Cantonese barbecue-pork-filled bun (baozi); filled with barbecue-flavored cha siu pork
 Cheese bun – A variety of small, baked, cheese-flavored rolls, a popular snack and breakfast food in Bolivia, Brazil (especially in the state of Minas Gerais), Paraguay, Colombia and northern Argentina
 Chelsea bun – A currant bun that is first created in the 18th century at the Chelsea Bun House in Chelsea, London, an establishment favoured by Hanoverian royalty which was demolished in 1839
 Cinnamon bun – A sweet roll served commonly in Northern Europe and North America; its main ingredients are dough, cinnamon, sugar, and butter, which provide a robust and sweet flavor
 Cocktail bun – A Hong Kong-style sweet bun with a filling of shredded coconut; one of several iconic types of baked goods originating from Hong Kong
 Colston bun – A bun named after Edward Colston; made in the city of Bristol, England; composed of a yeast dough flavored with dried fruit, candied peel and sweet spices
 Cream bun – A bun that varies all around the world; typically they are made with an enriched dough bread roll that is baked and cooled, then split and filled with cream
 Currant bun – A sweet bun that contains currants or raisins; towards the end of the seventeenth century the Reverend Samuel Wigley founded the Currant Bun Company in Southampton, Hampshire UK
 Curry bread - Some Japanese curry is wrapped in a piece of dough, which is coated in flaky bread crumbs, and usually deep fried or baked.
D

 Da Bao - An extra large version of the Chinese steamed bun. When translated, the name literally means big bun.
 Dampfnudel – A white bread roll or sweet roll eaten as a meal or as a dessert in Germany and in France (Alsace); a typical dish in southern Germany
F
 Finger Bun - A hot dog sized fruit bun with flavoured icing originating in Australia.
 Fruit bun – A sweet roll made with fruit, fruit peel, spices and sometimes nuts; a tradition in Britain and former British colonies including Jamaica, Australia, Singapore, and India
H

 Ham and egg bun – A Hong Kong bun or bread that contains a sheet of egg and ham
 Hamburger bun – A round bun designed to encase a hamburger; invented in 1916 by a fry cook named Walter Anderson, who co-founded White Castle in 1921
Hawaiian buns aka Portuguese sweet bread – A sweet bread roll which was brought to Hawaii by Portuguese immigrants and is now known as Hawaiian Bread.
 Heißwecke – A traditional type of currant bun that goes back, within the German-speaking region of Europe, at least to the Late Middle Ages
 Honey bun – A sweet roll of American origin, somewhat similar to the cinnamon bun, that is popular in the southeast United States
 Hoppang – A variant of jjinppang (Korean steamed bun)
 Hot cross bun – A sweet, spiced bun usually made with fruit but with other varieties such as apple-cinnamon or maple syrup and blueberries and marked with a cross on the top, traditionally eaten on Good Friday in the UK, Australia, New Zealand, South Africa, and Canada, but now popular all year round
 Hot dog bun – A long, soft bun shaped specifically to contain a hot dog or frankfurter
I
 Iced bun – A bread roll that is made to a sweet recipe with an icing sugar glaze covering the top
J
 Jjinppang – A Korean steamed bun with red bean paste filling
K
 Krachel: Moroccan buns, see Qrashel
L

 London bun – square shaped or rectangle bun made of rich yeast dough flavored with either currants or caraway seeds and topped with white sugar icing
 Longevity peach - A type of lotus seed bun that is white with a red dyed tip with a crease along the side, mimicking the shape of a peach.
 Lotus seed bun – A Chinese sweet bun found in China, prepared by steaming a yeast-leavened dough that contains lotus seed paste
M
 Manchet – A yeast bread of very good quality, or a small flat circular loaf of the same; small enough to be held in the hand.
 Mandarin roll – A steamed bun originating from China; cooked by steaming; a food staple of Chinese cuisine which is similar to white bread in western cuisine
 Mantou – A steamed bread or bun originating in China; typically eaten as a staple in northern parts of China where wheat, rather than rice, is grown
 Melonpan – A sweet bun from Japan, also popular in Taiwan, China and Latin America; made from an enriched dough covered in a thin layer of crisp cookie dough
 Momo - A type of South Asian dumpling, popular across the Indian subcontinent and the Himalayan regions of broader South Asia.
N
 Nikuman – A bun made from flour dough, and filled with cooked ground pork or other ingredients; a kind of chūka man (中華まん lit. Chinese-style steamed bun) also known in English as pork buns
 Nigerian buns
P

 Pampushka - A small savory or sweet yeast-raised bun or doughnut typical for Ukrainian cuisine.
 Pan de muerto – Spanish for "Bread of the Dead"; also called "pan de los muertos"; a sweet roll traditionally baked in Mexico during the weeks leading up to the Día de los Muertos,  celebrated on November 1 and 2; a sweetened soft bread shaped like a bun, often decorated with bone-like pieces
 Pão de queijo - A Brazilian cheese bread, small, baked cheese roll, a popular snack and breakfast food in Brazil.
 Peanut butter bun – A Hong Kong sweet bun also found in Chinatown bakery shops; it has layers of peanut butter filling, sometimes with light sprinkles of sugar mixed in for extra flavor
 Pets de sœurs – A French Canadian sweet bun, similar in construction to a cinnamon bun.
 Pebete – An Argentine soft oval bun made of wheat flour with a thin brown crust, rather like a fatter hot dog roll
 Penny bun – A small bread bun or loaf which cost one old penny at the time when there were 240 pence to the pound; it was a common size loaf of bread in England regulated by the Assize of Bread Act of 1266; the size of the loaf could vary depending on the prevailing cost of the flour used in the baking; a version of the nursery rhyme London Bridge Is Falling Down includes the line "build it up with penny loaves"
 Piggy bun – A Hong Kong pastry that is essentially the equivalent of the French baguette; found in Hong Kong bakeries and Cha chaan teng; in Hong Kong, it is often cut in half and served with butter and condensed milk
 Pineapple bun – A sweet bun predominantly popular in Hong Kong and Macau, though they are not uncommon in Chinatowns worldwide; although it is known as "pineapple bun", the traditional version contains no pineapple
 Pork chop bun – famous and popular snack in Macau, the "piggy bun" is crisp outside and soft inside; a freshly fried pork chop is filled into it

Q
 Qrashel: Moroccan buns or bread rolls made of sesame and anise seeds.

R
 Rum roll - historic Washington D.C. specialty, similar to a cinnamon bun with rum flavored icing

S

 Saffron bun – A rich, spiced, yeast-leavened sweet bun, flavored with saffron and cinnamon or nutmeg, and contains currants, similar to a teacake
 Sally Lunn bun – An enriched yeast bread associated with the city of Bath in the West Country of England
 Sausage bun – Hong Kong pastry, essentially the equivalent of pigs in a blanket; found in Hong Kong as well as in many bakeries in Chinatowns in western countries
 Semla – A traditional sweet roll made in various forms in Denmark, the Faroe Islands, Iceland, Estonia, Finland, Latvia, Lithuania, Sweden and Norway; associated with Lent and especially Shrove Monday and Shrove Tuesday; the oldest version of the semla was a plain bread bun, eaten in a bowl of warm milk; in Swedish this is known as hetvägg
 Shengjian mantou - A type of small, pan-fried baozi which is a specialty of Shanghai and usually filled with pork and gelatin that melts into soup/liquid when cooked.
 Siopao – Hokkien term for bāozi (包 子), literally meaning "steamed buns"; it has also been incorporated into Thai cuisine where it is called salapao
 Spiced bun – A sweet bun to which spices are added; common examples are the hot cross bun and the Jamaican spiced bun
 Sufganiyah - A deep-fried bun, filled with jam or custard, and then topped with powdered sugar. Typically eaten in Israel during Hanukkah.
 Sticky bun – A dessert or breakfast sweet roll that generally consists of rolled pieces of leavened dough, sometimes containing brown sugar or cinnamon, which are then compressed together to form a flat loaf corresponding to the size of the baking pan; they have been consumed since the Middle Ages, at which time cinnamon became more prominent
T

 Teacake - A fruited sweet bun usually served toasted and buttered.
 Tingmo -  A steamed bread in Tibetan cuisine.[1] It is sometimes described as a steamed bun[2] that is similar to Chinese flower rolls. It does not contain any kind of filling.
 Tuna bun – A Hong Kong-style fish bun that contains tuna paste; commonly found in Hong Kong

W
 Wang Mandu – A savory steamed bun filled with vegetables and meat. Literally means,"king dumpling" or "big dumpling".

X
 Xiaolongbao – A steamed bun from the Jiangnan region of China; fillings vary by region and usually include some meat and/or a gelatin-gelled aspic that becomes a soup when steamed

Z
 Zeeuwse bolus – A spiral shaped bun covered in dark brown sugar, lemon zest and cinnamon.

See also

 List of baked goods
 List of bread rolls
 List of British breads
 List of foods

References

 
Quick breads
Sweet breads
Yeast breads
Lists of breads